Ocean Shores Municipal Airport  is a city-owned, public-use airport located two nautical miles (4 km) northeast of the central business district of Ocean Shores, a city in Grays Harbor County, Washington, United States. It is included in the National Plan of Integrated Airport Systems for 2011–2015, which categorized it as a general aviation facility.

Facilities and aircraft 
Ocean Shores Municipal Airport covers an area of 49 acres (20 ha) at an elevation of 15 feet (5 m) above mean sea level. It has one runway designated 15/33 with an asphalt surface measuring 3,100 by 50 feet (945 x 15 m).

For the 12-month period ending May 31, 2011, the airport had 4,250 general aviation aircraft operations, an average of 11 per day.

References

External links 
 Airport page at City of Ocean Shores website
 Ocean Shores Municipal (W04) at WSDOT Airport Directory
 Aerial image as of June 1990 from USGS The National Map

Airports in Washington (state)
Ocean Shores, Washington
Transportation buildings and structures in Grays Harbor County, Washington